Baron Samu Hazai (26 December 1851 – 10 February 1942) was a Hungarian military officer and politician of Jewish origin, who served as Minister of Defence of Hungary between 1910 and 1917.

Decorations and awards

 Military Merit Medal in bronze (Austria-Hungary, March 1900) - for his services as an instructor.
 Order of the Iron Crown, 3rd class (Austria, June 1904) - for his services in the military training
 Knight's Cross of the Order of Leopold (Austria, 10 April 1908)
 Grand Cross of the Order of Military Merit (Spain, 1909)
 Order of the Red Eagle, 1st class (Prussia, 1910)
 Order of Prince Danilo I, 1st class (Montenegro, 1910)
 Appointment to the Privy Council (December 1910)
 Order of the Iron Crown, 1st class (12 August 1913)
 Military Merit Cross, 1st class with war decoration (Austria-Hungary, 3 February 1915)
 Star of the Decoration of Honour for Services to the Red Cross (1915)
 Iron Cross of 1914, 1st and 2nd class (Prussia, 1915)
 Grand Cross of the Military Merit with Swords (Bavaria, 1915)
 Grand Cross of the Order of Leopold (June 1916); war decoration added on 10 August 1916
 Large Military Merit Medal in Gold (25 November 1916)
 Grand Cross of the Order of the Crown (Württemberg, 1916)
 Grand Cross with swords and golden star of the Albert Order, (Saxony, 1916)
 Order of the Medjidie, 1st class (Ottoman Empire, 1917)
 Gallipoli Star ("Iron Crescent", Ottoman Empire, 1917)
 Imtiyaz Medal in Gold  (Ottoman Empire, 1917)
 Military Merit Cross, 3rd class with war decoration in diamonds (Austria-Hungary, 12 August 1918)

References

External links

 Magyar Életrajzi Lexikon

1851 births
1942 deaths
Barons of Hungary
Hungarian nobility
People from Rimavská Sobota
Jewish Hungarian politicians
Hungarian soldiers
Austro-Hungarian military personnel of World War I
Austro-Hungarian Army officers
Defence ministers of Hungary
Hungarian Jews
Grand Crosses of Military Merit
Recipients of the Iron Cross (1914), 1st class
Grand Crosses of the Military Merit Order (Bavaria)
Recipients of the Order of the Medjidie, 1st class
Recipients of the Imtiyaz Medal